Vishnampet R. Ramachandra Dikshitar (16 April 1896 – 24 November 1953) was a historian, Indologist and Dravidologist from the Indian state of Tamil Nadu. He was professor of history and archaeology at the University of Madras and is the author of standard text books on Indian history.

Early life 

Ramachandra Dikshitar was born in the village of Vishnampettai or Vishnampet in Madras Presidency in an orthodox Brahmin family on 16 April 1896. He did his schooling at Sir P S Sivaswami Iyer High School at Thirukkattupalli and earned his bachelor of arts in history with distinction from St. Joseph's College, Tiruchirappalli in 1920. He completed his master's in history in 1923 along with a diploma in economics and obtained his PhD from Madras University in 1927.

Academic career 

Ramachandra Dikshitar joined as a lecturer in history at St.Joseph College, Trichy. In 1928, he was appointed as a lecturer in the Department of History and Archaeology, University of Madras. He was promoted to reader in 1946 and made Professor in 1947.

Ramachandra Dikshitar specialized in Indian history in general, and Tamil history, in particular. He was a renowned Sanskrit scholar of his time.

Works 

Ramachandra Dikshitar authored a number of books on history. He was the general editor of the Madras University Historical Series. He translated the Silappathikaram in 1939 and the Tirukkural in 1949 into English.

Some of his prominent works are:

Death 
Ramachandra Dikshitar died on 24 November 1953.

Legacy 

R. Nagaswamy, former director of archaeology, Government of India, once said of Ramachandra Dikshitar:

Historical methodology 

Ramachandra Dikshitar introduced a new methodology in the study of ancient Indian history. His book "Warfare in Ancient India" speaks of the usage of vimanas in wars in ancient India and claims that the boomerang was invented in South India.
He believed that the references to the vimanas were quite real as evidenced by his writings in "Warfare in Ancient India"

In his Origin and Spread of the Tamils, Dikshitar includes Australia and Polynesia among the regions known to the ancient South Indians thereby suggesting that South Indian traders might have at least had a general idea of existence of the Australian continent even before it was discovered by Portuguese and Dutch sea-farers of the 16th and 17th centuries.

See also

 Tirukkural translations
 Tirukkural translations into English
 List of translators into English

Notes

References 
 

1896 births
1953 deaths
Indian Indologists
Dravidologists
St Joseph's College, Tiruchirappalli alumni
Academic staff of the University of Madras
Tamil–English translators
Scholars from Chennai
Translators of the Tirukkural into English
20th-century translators
People from Thanjavur district
Tirukkural translators